Lam Tin Park is a park located in Lam Tin, Kwun Tong District, Hong Kong. The park was built in 1991 along Black Hill, at the site of a landslide caused by a rainstorm in 1982.

References

Lam Tin
Parks in Hong Kong